The Men's marathon T42-46 was a marathon event in athletics at the 1996 Summer Paralympics, for amputee athletes. Javier Conde and Joseba Larrinaga finished in gold and silver medal positions respectively for Spain, ensuring that Conde won his first marathon title, also setting a world Record. Of the nine starters, seven reached the finish line.

Results

See also
 Marathon at the Paralympics

References 

Men's marathon T42-46
1996 marathons
Marathons at the Paralympics
Men's marathons